Blue pages are a telephone directory listing of American and Canadian state agencies,  government agencies, federal government and other official entities, along with specific offices, departments, or bureaus located wherein.

Canada
Canadian yellow-page listings currently indicate "Government Of Canada-See Government Listings In The Blue Pages"; in markets where the local telephone directory is a single volume, the blue pages and community information normally appear after the alphabetical white-page listings but before the yellow pages advertising. The blue page listings include both provincial and federal entities.

United States
In the United States, the blue pages included state, federal, and local offices, including service districts such as school districts, port authorities, public utility providers, parks districts, fire districts, and the like. The blue pages also provided information about government services, in addition to officials' names, addresses, telephone numbers, and other contact information. The color blue is likely derived from so-called government blue books, official publications printed by a government (such as that of a state) describing its organization, and providing a list of contact information. (The blue pages published in a printed telephone directory is usually quite abridged, compared to official blue books).

Other
The name "blue pages" has been used for various specialised directories by private-sector entities such as the internal IBM Staff directory.

External links
 "USA Blue Pages" - officialusa.com, an unofficial blue pages directory for US federal and state agencies

Telephone numbers
Directories